Events from the year 1988 in art.

Events
Opening of the Kiasma Contemporary Art Museum in Helsinki, designed by Steven Holl
Donatello's bronze Judith and Holofernes is replaced on the Piazza della Signoria in Florence by a replica and moved inside the Palazzo Vecchio.
David Hockney begins a series of paintings at his seaside home in Malibu, California.

Exhibitions
July – Freeze, Surrey Docks, London

Awards
Archibald Prize: Fred Cress – John Beard
Turner Prize – Tony Cragg

Works

Artists of Ramingining, Northern Territory, Australia – Aboriginal Memorial
Francis Bacon – Second Version of Triptych 1944
Gordon Bennett – Outsider
Wayne Chabre
Gargoyles (Eugene, Oregon)
Alan Turing
Drosophila Fly Head
Grasshopper (sculpture, Salem, Oregon)
Eldon Garnet – Little Glenn (bronze statue)
Rachel Joynt – People's Island (brass installation, Dublin)
Nabil Kanso – Dance of Salome (first series)
Judith Weinshall Liberman – Holocaust Wall Hangings (first works in series)
Richard Lippold – Ex Stasis (sculpture)
Paul Matisse – Kendall Band (sound sculpture)
David K. Nelson, Jr. – Mirth & Girth
Louise Nevelson – Sky Landscape (sculpture)
Éamonn O'Doherty – Anna Livia (bronze installation, Dublin)
Fred Parhad – Ashurbanipal (bronze, San Francisco)
Zlatko Pounov and Steven Lowe – Statue of Mahatma Gandhi (San Francisco)
Paula Rego – The Dance
Gerhard Richter – Betty
Susan Dorothea White – The First Supper
Christopher Wool – Apocalypse Now ("word painting")

Births
12 September – Alireza Shojaian, Iranian painter

Deaths

January to June
19 January – Cesare Brandi, art critic, historian, and specialist in conservation-restoration theory (b. 1906).
31 January – Nedeljko Gvozdenović, a world-renowned Serbian painter (b. 1902).
3 February – Ronald Bladen, American sculptor (b. 1918).
19 March – Isabel Bishop, American painter and graphic artist (b. 1902).
28 March – Neil Williams, American painter (b. 1934).
31 March – Georges Lévis, French comic artist (b. 1924).
2 April – E. Chambré Hardman, Irish-born British photographer (b. 1898).
3 April – Milton Caniff, American cartoonist (b. 1907).
17 April
 Toni Frissell, American photographer (b. 1907]).
 Louise Nevelson, Ukrainian-born American artist (b. 1900).
26 April – Guy Boyd, Australian potter and figurative sculptor (b. 1923)
4 May – Stanley Hayter, English-born printmaker (b. 1901).
6 May – Constantino Nivola, Italian sculptor (b. 1911)
16 May – Charles Keeping, English illustrator, children's book author and lithographer (b. 1924).
16 June – Andrea Pazienza, Italian comics artist (b. 1956).

July to December
12 July – Julian Trevelyan, English printmaker (b. 1910).
24 July – Mira Schendel, Swiss-born Brazilian modernist artist and poet (b. 1919).
12 August – Jean-Michel Basquiat, American artist (b. 1960).
21 August – Ray Eames, American artist and architect (b. 1912).
26 September – Marianne Appel, American mural painter and puppet designer (b. 1913).
29 September – Charles Addams, American cartoonist (b. 1912).
28 October – Pietro Annigoni, Italian painter (b. 1910)
12 November – Primo Conti, Italian Futurist artist (b. 1900).
25 November – Alphaeus Philemon Cole, American portrait artist (b. 1876 [sic.])
2 December – Kimon Evan Marengo, Egyptian-born British cartoonist (b. 1904).
30 December – Isamu Noguchi, Japanese American artist and landscape architect (b. 1904).

Date unknown
Reginald George Haggar, English ceramic designer (b. 1905).

See also 
 1988 in Fine Arts of the Soviet Union

References 

 
 
1980s in art
Years of the 20th century in art